Nancy Marguerite Farriss (born May 23, 1938) is an American historian who is professor emerita at the University of Pennsylvania.

Life
Nancy Marguerite Farriss was born on May 23, 1938. She specializes in the colonial history of Mexico, and completed her doctorate from University College London in 1965, after she earned a B.A. at Barnard College. This was followed by brief posts at the University of the West Indies, Jamaica and the College of William and Mary in Williamsburg, VA.  In 1971 she was appointed as Associate Professor of History at the University of Pennsylvania and continued there for the rest of her career, becoming Annenberg Professor of History in 1990.  She is now professor emerita.

Awards
 1983 Guggenheim Fellowship
 1985 Beveridge Award for Maya society under colonial rule: The collective enterprise of survival
 1986 MacArthur Fellows Program

Works
 Ecclesiastical immunity in new Spain 1760–1815 1965
 Crown and clergy in colonial Mexico, 1759–1821: the crisis of ecclesiastical privilege, Athlone Press, 1968

References

External links

 CNCA /  Artes de México
Pasta: Rústica  
Número de páginas: 552 
Idioma: Español 
Publicación: CONACULTA – INAH / Artes de México 
Precio: $600 
Ciudad de publicación: México, D. F. 
País de publicación: México

University of Pennsylvania faculty
University of Pennsylvania historian
Living people
MacArthur Fellows
21st-century American historians
Historians of Mexico
Alumni of University College London
American women historians
1938 births
Place of birth missing (living people)
Barnard College alumni
21st-century American women